49 Arietis is a single star in the northern constellation of Aries. 49 Arietis is the Flamsteed designation. It is visible to the naked eye as a faint, white hued star with an apparent visual magnitude of 5.90. The star is located at a distance of about  distant from Earth based on parallax.

This object is classified as an Am star, or non-magnetic chemically peculiar star of the CP1 class, which means the spectrum displays abnormal abundances of certain heavier elements.

References

External links
 HR 905
 Image 49 Arietis

A-type main-sequence stars
Am stars
Suspected variables
Aries (constellation)
BD+25 0477
Arietis, 49
018769
014109
0905